A. I. Selden Dam is a dam in Hale County, Alabama. It impounds the Black Warrior River for navigation and flood control. Named for the U.S. representative from Alabama, Armistead I. Selden, Jr., the dam is owned and operated by the Corps of Engineers.

The riverine reservoir it creates, Warrior Lake, has a water surface of 12.2 square miles, a length of 77 miles, and has a maximum capacity of 58,650 acre-feet.  Recreation includes camping, boating, fishing, hunting, and hiking, as well as seven day-use parks maintained by the Corps.  Alabama's Hale County Road 38 crosses the river over the dam.

References 

Dams in Alabama
Reservoirs in Alabama
United States Army Corps of Engineers dams
Buildings and structures in Hale County, Alabama
Dams completed in 1958